Per Gynt is a Norwegian fairy tale which originated in the traditional region of  Gudbrandsdal.

The story of Per Gynt is set in the historic district of Gudbrandsdal in Norway. Per Gynt's home in the folklore is traditionally claimed to have been Nordre Hågå farm in Sødorp parish at Nord-Fron in the county of Oppland.

The tales encompass the themes of identity, relationships and personal stories from a lonely hunter. The  folk tale tells  of the eponymous Per Gynt and his various exploits. He rescues three dairy-maids from trolls and shoots the Bøyg, a troll which takes the form of a gigantic serpent and stands as a hindrance to travellers.

The fairy tale was recorded by Peter Christen Asbjørnsen in Norwegian Folktales (Norske Huldre-Eventyr og Folkesagn) which was first published in 1845. Asbjørnsen included the stories about Per Gynt into the section "Reindeer Hunting at Rondane"  (Rensdyrjakt ved Rondane).

The folktale served as inspiration for Henrik Ibsen's play Peer Gynt  which was published in 1867. Ibsen added considerable material, such as Per Gynt travelling to Africa, crossing the Sahara and meeting with a Bedouin princess – 19th-century themes far beyond the scope of the original fairy tale. The play appeared on stage in 1876, accompanied by incidental music by composer Edvard Grieg who composed the  Peer Gynt Suite.

References

Other sources
 
Meyer, Michael  (1974)  Ibsen: A Biograph  (Abridged edition. Pelican Biographies ser. Harmondsworth: Penguin) 
Sverre Mørkhagen  (1997) Peer Gynt – historie, sagn og «forbandet Digt» (Oslo: J.W. Cappelens forlag.)

External links

Norwegian fairy tales
Norwegian folklore
Scandinavian folklore